The N-655 or National Highway 655 is a national highway in Pakistan which extends from Ratodero to Naudero in Sindh province. Its total length is 18 km and is maintained by the National Highway Authority.

See also

References

External links
 National Highway Authority

Roads in Pakistan
Roads in Sindh